Atenia or Atenoa, also known as Atmenia (Ὰτμενία), was a town of ancient Pisidia. It became a bishopric; no longer the seat of a residential bishop, it remains a titular see of the Roman Catholic Church.

Its site is located near Kireli Kasaba, in Asiatic Turkey.

References

Populated places in Pisidia
Catholic titular sees in Asia
Former populated places in Turkey
Roman towns and cities in Turkey
Populated places of the Byzantine Empire
History of Konya Province